Gordeyevka is the name of several rural localities in Russia:
Gordeyevka, Altai Krai, a selo in Khayryuzovsky Selsoviet of Troitsky District of Altai Krai
Gordeyevka, Bryansk Oblast, a selo in Gordeyevsky Selsoviet of Gordeyevsky District of Bryansk Oblast
Gordeyevka, Kursk Oblast, a selo in Gordeyevsky Selsoviet of Korenevsky District of Kursk Oblast
Gordeyevka, Nizhny Novgorod Oblast, a village in Gorevsky Selsoviet of Koverninsky District of Nizhny Novgorod Oblast
Gordeyevka, Yaroslavl Oblast, a village in Zarubinsky Rural Okrug of Myshkinsky District of Yaroslavl Oblast